Angela King may refer to:
Angela King (diplomat), Jamaican diplomat
Angela King (environmentalist)
Angela King (peace activist)
Angie King, musician
Angela King-Twitero, professional cheerleading director